Penicillium canis is a fungus species of the genus of Penicillium which was isolated from a dog which suffered from osteomyelitis.

See also 
List of Penicillium species

References 

canis
Fungi described in 2014